During the 2003–04 English football season, West Bromwich Albion F.C. competed in the First Division.

Season summary

In the 2003–04 season, Albion had their best League Cup run for 22 years, beating Newcastle United and Manchester United before losing to Arsenal in the quarter-finals. The team also enjoyed good form in the league, remaining in the top two from mid-October until the end of the season, winning promotion back to the Premiership, again as runners-up, at the first attempt.

Albion unveiled the Astle Gates outside their home ground, The Hawthorns, in July 2003. The gates are a tribute to the club's former striker, Jeff Astle, who died in January 2002.

Final league table

Results
West Bromwich Albion's score comes first

Legend

Football League First Division

FA Cup

League Cup

Players

First-team squad

Left club during season

Notes

References

West Bromwich Albion F.C. seasons
West Bromwich Albion